Hensley is an unincorporated community on the Tug Fork River in McDowell County, West Virginia, United States. According to the Geographic Names Information System, Hensley has also been known by the names Claren, Claren Station, and Hensley Claren.

References

Unincorporated communities in McDowell County, West Virginia
Unincorporated communities in West Virginia